is a railway station in Aoi-ku, Shizuoka, Shizuoka Prefecture, Japan, operated by the private railway company, Shizuoka Railway (Shizutetsu).

Lines
Naganuma Station is a  station on the Shizuoka–Shimizu Line and is 3.1 kilometers from the starting point of the line at Shin-Shizuoka Station.

Station layout
The station has a single side platform and an island platform on a head shunt servicing three tracks, with a level crossing at one end. The station building, located at the end of one of the platforms, has automated ticket machines, and automated turnstiles, which accept the LuLuCa smart card ticketing system as well as the PiTaPa and ICOCA IC cards.

Platforms

Adjacent stations

|-
!colspan=5| Shizuoka Railway Company

Station history
Naganuma Station was established on December 9, 1908.

Passenger statistics
In fiscal 2017, the station was used by an average of 1200 passengers daily (boarding passengers only).

Surrounding area
North of the station is the main Rail yard of the Shizuoka–Shimizu Line.
Higashi-Shizuoka Station on the Tōkaidō Main Line is an eight-minute walk away.

See also
 List of railway stations in Japan

References

External links

 Shizuoka Railway official website

}

Railway stations in Shizuoka Prefecture
Railway stations in Japan opened in 1908
Railway stations in Shizuoka (city)